Arthur Verocai is the debut studio album by Brazilian composer Arthur Verocai, released  by Continental Records in 1972.

Background
At the time of release, Verocai had been producing albums for musicians such as Elis Regina, Jorge Ben, and Ivan Lins. Around the time of recording, Verocai often listened to American funk and soul musicians which heavily influenced the sound of the album; some of these artists included Frank Zappa, Miles Davis, Stan Kenton, and Wes Montgomery.

Reception and legacy

The album was largely ignored by critics and sold very few copies upon its initial release in 1972. The low performance of the album motivated Verocai to rethink his career as a solo musician, deciding to pursue a music career in advertising.

Retrospective assessments of the album have been positive. Jason Ankeny of AllMusic awarded the album 4½ stars. Ankeny described the album as "fuse[ing] Brazilian tropicalia with American funk, yielding a shimmering, dreamlike mosaic of sound that both celebrates and advances the creative spirit." Hip-hop producer Madlib considers the album to be among his favorites stating, "I could listen to this album everyday for the rest of my life".

The album remained relatively unknown for three decades, making a resurgence in the mid-2000's due to hip-hop acts sampling various songs from the album. Rapper and producer MF DOOM sampled the song "Na Boca Do Sol" on the track "Orris Root Powder" in 2005. Hip-hop group Little Brother sampled Caboclo on the song "We Got Now" from their 2005 album The Minstrel Show.

Original copies of the LP have become highly sought after among fans and vinyl collectors since the album's resurgence. The Discogs marketplace reports a median selling price of $2,594.09 USD.

Track listing

Personnel
Credits adapted from liner notes.
 Arthur Verocai – Arranger, Composer, Guitar, Producer, Vocals
 Luiz Alves – Bass
 Victor Martins – Composer
 Paulinho Tapajós – Composer
 Robertinho Silva – Drums, Percussion
 Pascoal Meirelles – Drums
 Oberdan Magalhães – Flute, Saxophone
 Pedro Santos – Percussion
 Aloisio Milanez – Piano, Piano (electric)
 Paulo Moura – Sax (alto), Sax (soprano)
 Nivaldo Ornelas – Sax (tenor)
 Helio Delmiro – Soloist
 Luis Paulo Vimana – Synthesizer
 Edson Maciel – Trombone
 Serginho Trombone – Trombone
 Paulinho Trompete – Trumpet, Vocals
 Luiz Carlos Batera – Vocals
 Célia – Vocals
 Carlos Dafé – Vocals
 Gilda Horta – Vocals
 Toninho Horta – Vocals

References

1972 albums
Portuguese-language albums